Arab Israeli Dialogue is the tenth and final film directed by American independent filmmaker Lionel Rogosin. It is a filmed debate between the Palestinian poet Rashid Hussein and Amos Kenan, shot in the basement of Rogosin's Bleecker Street Cinema by Louis Brigante.

Though Rogosin would live until 2000, he did not complete another film in his lifetime, causing him immense personal and artistic frustration.

See also
 List of American films of 1974

External links

1974 films
American documentary films
1974 documentary films
Documentary films about the Israeli–Palestinian conflict
Films shot in New York City
Films directed by Lionel Rogosin
1970s American films